India Lockdown is a 2022 Indian Hindi-language drama film directed by Madhur Bhandarkar and produced by Pen India Limited along with Bhandarkar Entertainment. The film stars an ensemble cast of Shweta Basu Prasad, Aahana Kumra, Prateik Babbar, Sai Tamhankar, Prakash Belawadi and Saanand Verma. The film is schedule for a world premiere at 52nd International Film Festival of India. The film was for a commercial released on ZEE5 on December 2, 2022. The movie deals with the repercussions of COVID-19 lockdown in India and how the people of the country struggled through it.

Plot 
The film showcases four parallel stories – a father-daughter duo stuck in different cities, a sex worker and her troubles, a migrant worker with bare resources, and a pilot.

Cast 
Shweta Basu Prasad as Mehrunissa
Aahana Kumra as Moon Alves
Prateik Babbar as Madhav
Sai Tamhankar as Phoolmati
Prakash Belawadi as M Nageshwar Rao
 Tahura Mansuri as Meenu

Production 
The shoot of the film started after the 2020 lockdown. The shoots were wrapped by March 2021. The film secured a certification from the Central Board of Film Certification in October 2021.

Marketing 
The teaser trailer of the movie was released on November 8. Simultaneously it trending on Twitter leading to panic of another lockdown being imposed among the netizens.

Release 
It was announced in November 2022 that film would have a direct-to-digital release via ZEE5.

Reception 
Anuj Kumar for The Hindu wrote, "Madhur’s treatment of subjects is usually high-pitched and he paints his scenarios with broad strokes, but here, he has roped in a cast of competent actors to convey what is not there on the page." Shubhra Gupta of The Indian Express rated the movie 1.5/5 and wrote "...an older woman rescues a younger one from the flesh trade. The rest is just banal story-telling, with little new to say."  Zinia Bandyopadhyay of India Today gave the film a rating of 2/5 and wrote "Bhandarkar is an excellent director, and there is no doubt about that. But probably in his attempt to weave the story together, he missed other aspects like a compelling background score, or even performances, for that matter!" Ronak Kotecha of The Times of India rated the film 3/5 and wrote "More than 2 years after the first countrywide lockdown in India, director Madhur Bhandarkar and his writers (Amit Joshi and Aradhana Sah) have come up with a compilation of stories that are real and relatable."

References

External links 
 
 
India Lockdown on ZEE5

Indian drama films
2020s Hindi-language films
Films directed by Madhur Bhandarkar